Washington County is a county located in the northwestern part of the U.S. state of Florida, in the Panhandle. As of the 2020 census, the population was 25,318. Its county seat is Chipley.

History

Washington County was created in 1825, and was nearly twice the size of the State of Delaware, stretching all the way to the Gulf of Mexico.

Over a span of more than 150 years, Washington County has seen Native American, Spanish and English cultural influences. The county's historical lore is rich with stories of the exploits of Andrew Jackson. There are numerous Native American mounds and evidence of strong settlements still being discovered.

Named after George Washington, the first US president, the area was first settled by those seeking both economic and political freedom in this frontier land of vast timber and mineral resources. Inland waterway transportation brought about heavy river settlements. The arrival of railroads in the late 1800s boosted economic, social and political developments.

Vernon, the geographical center of the county, is named for George Washington's Virginia home, Mt. Vernon. The pioneer town was also the site of a major Indian settlement.

The county courthouse was located in Vernon during the early part of this century, until a railroad town in northeastern Washington County, Chipley, became the new and present county seat in 1927.

Washington County was once a dry county, meaning that the sale of alcoholic beverages was banned in the county. In January 2022, this restriction was removed following a voter referendum in which about two-thirds of voters supported the removal.

Geography

Adjacent counties
 Holmes County, Florida - north
 Jackson County, Florida - northeast
 Bay County, Florida - south
 Walton County, Florida - west

Demographics

As of the 2020 United States census, there were 25,318 people, 9,037 households, and 5,945 families residing in the county.

As of the census of 2000, there were 20,973 people, 7,931 households, and 5,646 families residing in the county. There were 9,503 housing units at an average density of 16 per square mile (6/km2). The racial makeup of the county was 81.72% White, 13.69% Black or African American, 1.54% Native American, 0.36% Asian, 0.06% Pacific Islander, 0.58% from other races, and 2.05% from two or more races. 2.30% of the population were Hispanic or Latino of any race.

There were 7,931 households, out of which 30.30% had children under the age of 18 living with them, 56.20% were married couples living together, 11.40% had a female householder with no husband present, and 28.80% were non-families. 25.10% of all households were made up of individuals, and 12.00% had someone living alone who was 65 years of age or older. The average household size was 2.46 and the average family size was 2.93.

In the county, the population was spread out, with 23.40% under the age of 18, 7.70% from 18 to 24, 28.50% from 25 to 44, 24.70% from 45 to 64, and 15.70% who were 65 years of age or older. The median age was 39 years. For every 100 females there were 105.80 males. For every 100 females age 18 and over, there were 105.90 males.

The median income for a household in the county was $27,922, and the median income for a family was $33,057. Males had a median income of $26,597 versus $20,198 for females. The per capita income for the county was $14,980. About 15.40% of families and 19.20% of the population were below the poverty line, including 26.90% of those under age 18 and 19.40% of those age 65 or over.

Education
The Washington County School District includes:
 Kate Smith Elementary School
 Vernon Elementary School
 Roulhac Middle School
 Vernon Middle School
 Chipley High School
 Vernon High School

Washington Public Library System
Washington County Public Library system has four branches:
 Washington County Public Library (Chipley Library)
 Sam Mitchell Public Library
 Wausau Public Library
 Sunny Hills Public Library

Media
 The Washington County News
 Foster Folly News
 The Chipley Bugle

Communities

Cities
 Chipley
 Vernon

Towns
 Caryville
 Ebro
 Wausau

Unincorporated communities
 Crow
 Five Points
 Gilberts Mill
 Greenhead
 Hinson's Crossroads
 Holmes Valley
 New Hope
 Poplar Head
 Red Head
 Sunny Hills

Transportation

Airports
 Washington County is served by Tri-County Airport, a general aviation airport 5.3 miles northwest of central Chipley. It has a 5398-foot runway, passenger terminal and two instrument approaches. Washington County appoints three of the nine-member board of directors which governs the airport.

Major highways

  Interstate 10 
  US 90 
  State Road 20 
  State Road 77
  State Road 79
  State Road 273
  State Road 277

Politics

See also
 Buckley v. Haddock (2008)
 National Register of Historic Places listings in Washington County, Florida

Notes

References

https://www.wjhg.com/2022/01/22/washington-county-dry-no-more/

External links
 Washington County News - newspaper that serves Washington County, Florida available in full-text with images in Florida Digital Newspaper Library
 Chipley Banner - newspaper that served Washington County, Florida from 1897 to 1900 available in full-text with images in Florida Digital Newspaper Library

Government links/Constitutional offices
 Washington County Board of County Commissioners
 Washington County Supervisor of Elections
 Washington County Property Appraiser
 Washington County Sheriff's Office
 Washington County Tax Collector

Special districts
 Washington District School Board
 Northwest Florida Water Management District

Judicial branch
 Washington County Clerk of Courts
 Circuit and County Court for the 14th Judicial Circuit of Florida serving Bay, Calhoun, Gulf, Holmes, Jackson and Washington counties

Community services
 Washington County Council on Aging - provides senior and elderly services including meals on wheels, case management, respite, workshops and more to residents throughout Washington County
 UF IFAS Extension Washington County - The Cooperative Extension Service is nationwide and was established by the Smith-Lever Act of 1914. It is a partnership between state land grant universities, the United States Department of Agriculture (USDA) and the county governments throughout the nation. In Florida, the Cooperative Extension Service is administered by the University of Florida. Thus, the Washington County Extension Service is a partnership between the USDA, the University of Florida and Washington County government. All of these groups share in the planning, financing, and operation of extension programs in the areas of Agriculture, Horticulture, Family and Consumer Sciences and 4H Youth Development.

Tourism links
 Washington County Chamber of Commerce
 Washington County Tourist Development Council

 
Florida counties
1825 establishments in Florida Territory
Populated places established in 1825
North Florida